St John’s Almshouses (formally the Hospital of St John the Baptist) are Grade II listed  Almshouses in Ripon, North Yorkshire, England.

History

The hospital was founded by the Archbishop of York Thomas in the early 12th century.

In 1544-5 King Henry VIII allowed the Archbishop of York to take over responsibility for the hospital and appoint the masters.

Originally governed by an independent Master, the Mastership was transferred to the Dean of Ripon in 1688.

The current almshouses were built in 1878 to the designs of the architect Robert Hargreave Brodrick.

References

Ripon
Ripon
Residential buildings completed in 1878
Ripon
Ripon
Ripon